Parathesis eggersiana is a species of plant in the family Primulaceae. It is endemic to Ecuador.

References

Endemic flora of Ecuador
eggersiana
Critically endangered plants
Taxonomy articles created by Polbot